Adhi'adeye or Ade Adeeye (Somali: Adhi Cadeeye) is a town in the Sool region of Somaliland]. It is around 30 miles northwest of Las Anod, the regional capital of Sool.

History 
In October 2014, the Cilmi Naaleeye branch of the Dhulbahante clan held a clan meeting in Adhi'adeye.

In May 2016, Mustafe Maxamuud Awseed was appointed Sultan of the Fiqi-shini, a segment of the Habr Gedir, in Adhi'adeye.

In December 2020, a quarter century of clan warfare ended in Adhi'adeye.

Demographics
Adhi'adeye is a town created in the 20th century and was founded by the Naleye Ahmed, a sub-subsection of the Mohamoud Garad branch of the Dhulbahante. The town is primarily inhabited by the Reer Cilmi (Elmi Naleye) sub-clan of the Naleye Ahmed. Other Mohamoud Garad residents of the town include the Jama Siad, mainly the Warsame Ali (Reer Ciye) subsection. There is a segment of the Hawiye, called Fiqishini, who are also present too.

See also
Administrative divisions of Somaliland
Regions of Somaliland
Districts of Somaliland
Somalia–Somaliland border

References

Populated places in Sool, Somaliland